Notu Uronlineu (stylized NOTU_URONLINEU) is the second studio album by producer Scratcha DVA, released on 16 October 2016 through Hyperdub.

Track listing

References

2016 albums
Scratcha DVA albums